Sutch is a surname. Notable people with this surname include:

 Bill Sutch (1907–1975), New Zealand economist, historian, writer and public servant
 Daryl Sutch (born 1971), football player
 David Edward Sutch, also known as Screaming Lord Sutch (1940–1999), English musician and politician
 David Sutch (priest) (born 1947), British archdeacon
 Richard Sutch (1942–2019)
 Ronald Sutch (1890–1975), British archdeacon